Golshah Naruyi (also Romanized as Golshāh Nārūyī; also known as Karīm Nārūyī) is a village in Dust Mohammad Rural District, in the Central District of Hirmand County, Sistan and Baluchestan Province, Iran. At the 2006 census, its population was 61, in 9 families.

References 

Populated places in Hirmand County